, there were 1,429 electric vehicles in South Dakota, equivalent to 0.12% of all vehicles in the state.

Government policy
, South Dakota does not offer any tax incentives for electric vehicle purchases.

Charging stations
, there were 57 public charging stations in South Dakota.

, the state recognizes I-29, I-90, I-229, and I-190 as "alternative fuel corridors" with plans for charging stations every .

By region

Rapid City
, there were 10 public charging stations in Rapid City.

Sioux Falls
The first electric vehicle was added to the Sioux Falls city fleet in early 2022.

References

South Dakota
Road transportation in South Dakota